William L. "Babe" Davis, was an American baseball left fielder in the Negro leagues. He played from 1937 to 1939 with the Atlanta Black Crackers/Indianapolis ABCs.

References

External links
 and Seamheads

Baseball players from Georgia (U.S. state)
Atlanta Black Crackers players
Year of birth missing
Year of death missing
Baseball outfielders